In information technology, a service level indicator (SLI) is a measure of the service level provided by a service provider to a customer. SLIs form the basis of service level objectives (SLOs), which in turn form the basis of service level agreements (SLAs); an SLI is thus also called an SLA metric.

Though every system is different in the services provided, often common SLIs are used. Common SLIs include latency, throughput, availability, and error rate; others include durability (in storage systems), end-to-end latency (for complex data processing systems, especially pipelines), and correctness.

References

IT service management
Outsourcing